The Fuel is a collaborative EP by Brooklyn-based rappers Koncept and J57. Released through KON57 Records, the EP features vocal appearances from Hollis, Akie Bermiss, The Grand Concourse, Dice Raw, Denitia, Andrew Thomas Reid and Nevaeh.

Background
The Fuel was started as a project in 2014. The release date of the EP was announced via online media followed by its cover art and track list. It was released on 20 November 2015 through Koncept and J57's imprint called Kon57 Records via Soulspazm Distribution on iTunes.

Critical reception
The Fuel was received to critical and positive review among music critics. KC Orcutt of The Source gave it a favorable review stating that, “The Fuel EP is an underground soundtrack for warriors...J57's top notch big stadium production and Koncept's deeply personal lyrics makes The Fuel feel-good music for the people who always root for the underdogs”. Just Jay of The Hype Magazine also had positive review on the production and inspirational lyrics of the EP stating that, “As Koncept details his inspirations in rap and life, each of The Fuel's eight songs feels like a revelation, thanks in no small part to the vibrant sonic canvasses of J57”.

Singles
On 25 September 2015, "Porcelain" was released as the first official single off the EP featuring vocals from Hollis. The video for "Porcelain" was shot on the Oregon Coast by Jesse Vinton. "The Fuel" was released as the second single off the EP followed by "Crazy is Beautiful" and "Excitement" which featured vocals from Nevaeh and Andrew Thomas Reid respectively.

Track listing

Release history

Personnel
Keith Whitehead – primary artiste
James Heinz – producer
Hollis Wear-Wong – featured artiste
Akie Bermiss – featured artiste
Nevaeh – featured artiste
Denitia Odigie – featured artiste
The Grand Concourse – featured artiste
Karl Jerkins – featured artiste
Andrew Thomas Reid – featured artiste

References

2015 EPs
J57 EPs